The College of God's Gift, often referred to as the Old (Dulwich) College, was a historic charity founded in 1619 by the Elizabethan actor and businessman Edward Alleyn who endowed it with the ancient Manor of Dulwich in south London. In 1857 it was renamed as Alleyn's College of God's Gift. The charity was reorganised in 1882 and again in 1995, when its varied component activities were split up into separate registered charities. The former constituent elements of College of God's Gift, which have been independent charities since 1995, are:
 the Dulwich Estate, the successor charity which owns the remaining freehold land of the manor of Dulwich;
 Alleyn's School
 Dulwich College
 James Allen's Girls' School
 Dulwich Almshouse located in the Old College complex
 Christ's Chapel of God's Gift located in the Old College complex
 Dulwich Picture Gallery, which became independent and ceased to be a beneficiary in 1995

The Foundation is also required to support from its endowment, as originally required by Alleyn, the Central Foundation Schools of London, which benefits Central Foundation Boys' School and Central Foundation Girls' School, and St Olave's & St Saviour's Schools Foundation, which benefits St Olave's Grammar School and St Saviour's and St Olave's Church of England School which are beneficiaries but wholly independent and indeed older foundations than that at Dulwich.

History

1619: Foundation: The College of God's Gift at Dulwich

On 21 June 1619 the letters patent were signed by James I authorising Edward Alleyn to establish a college in Dulwich to be called the College of God's Gift, in Dulwich in Surrey. The term Dulwich College was used colloquially from that date, such as in 1675 when John Evelyn described his visit to "Dulwich College" in his Diary. However, for at least 263 years this colloquialism was incorrect as the school was part of the overall charitable Foundation. Edward Alleyn, as well as being a famous Elizabethan actor, was also a man of great property and wealth, derived mainly from places of entertainment including theatres, bear-gardens and brothels. All of these ventures were legitimate at the time and rumours that Alleyn turned his attention towards charitable pursuits out of fear for his moral well-being have been traced to the journalist George Sala and discredited. Since 1605, Alleyn had owned the manorial estate of Dulwich, and it may have been around this time that he first had the idea of establishing a college or hospital for poor people and the education of poor boys. 
The building on Dulwich Green of a chapel, a schoolhouse and twelve almshouses, began in 1613 and was completed in the autumn of 1616. On 1 September 1616 the chapel was consecrated by the Archbishop of Canterbury who became the official Visitor. However, Edward Alleyn faced objections from Francis Bacon, the Lord Chancellor, in getting the patent of incorporation that was necessary to secure the Foundation's status as a college.  It was Alleyn's persistence that led to the foundation being endowed by James I's signing of the letters patent.

The charity originally consisted of a Master, Warden, four fellows, six poor brothers, six poor sisters and twelve poor scholars who became the joint legal owners of Alleyn's endowment of the manor and lands of Dulwich, collectively known as the Members of the college. The poor brothers and sisters and scholars were to be drawn from the four parishes which were most closely tied to Alleyn (being St Botolph's Bishopsgate where he was born, St Giles, Middlesex where he had built his Firtune Theatre, St Saviour's Southwark where he had the Paris Bear Garden, and St Giles Camberwell where the college was founded). The business of the charity was conducted in the name of these thirty members by the Master, Warden and four Fellows (Chaplain, Schoolmaster, Usher and Organist).

Alleyn drew upon the experience of other similar establishments in order to formulate the statutes and ordinances of the college (including borrowing the statutes of the already ancient Winchester College and visiting the more contemporary establishments of Sutton's Hospital (now Charterhouse School) and Croydon's Hospital (now Whitgift School)). Amongst the many statutes and ordinances signed by Alleyn that pertained to the charitable scheme were provisions that the scholars were entitled to stay until they were eighteen. And to be taught in good and sound learning'…'that they might be prepared for university or for good and sweet trades and occupations. Another stipulation was that the Master and Warden should always be unmarried and of Alleyn's blood, and surname, and if the former was impossible then at least of Alleyn's surname. Alleyn also made provision that the people of Dulwich should be able to have their men children instructed at the school for a fee as well as children from outside Dulwich for a separate fee.

The next 200 years were beset by both external difficulties such as diminishing financial fortunes and failing buildings as well as internal strife between the various Members of the College over problems both major and minor. The Official Visitor, the Archbishop of Canterbury, whose function was to see that the statutes were obeyed, was called in many times to sort out these issues. The lack of a disinterested body of governors and having no official connection to the Universities of Oxford or Cambridge contributed significantly to the school not fulfilling Alleyn's vision in its first 200 years. Some notable Masters did preside over the College in this time including James Allen (the first Master to drop the 'y' from his surname) who in 1741 made over to the college six houses in Kensington, the rents of which were to be used in the establishment of two little schools in Dulwich, one for boys from the village, the other for girls to read and sew, from which James Allen's Girls' School arose.

1808: Dulwich College Building Act

Having already obtained an Act in 1805 allowing them to enclose and develop  of common land within the manor, the college was granted the power by the 1808 Dulwich College Building Act to extend the period of which leases ran from twenty-one years as laid down by Alleyn, to eighty-four years, thus attracting richer tenants and bringing in vast sums of money. The additional wealth of the College eventually resulted in the Charity Commission setting up an enquiry into the advisability of widening the application of the funds to those extra beneficiaries Alleyn had specified in later amending clauses to the foundation's original statutes. Although the Master of the Rolls, Lord Langdale rejected the appeal in 1841 on the grounds that Alleyn had no right to alter the original statutes, he did express dissatisfaction with the college's provision of education.

1842: The Grammar School of the College of God's Gift

Immediately following this criticism, the Grammar School of the College of God's Gift was established in 1842 for the education of poor boys from Dulwich and Camberwell. To this school were transferred the boys of the James Allen Foundation, leaving James Allen's school to be for girls only. The Old Grammar School, as it became known, was erected in 1841 opposite the Old College, having been designed by Sir Charles Barry, the architect of the Palace of Westminster. It still exists today. The foundation scholars of the college, however, continued to receive an education far short of Alleyn's vision, however, despite further attempts at reform by the Visitor. In 1854, the college was investigated by a new Commission set up by the Charitable Trusts Act 1853 and the scheme resulting from their investigation led to the 1857 Dulwich College Act. The Grammar school educated around 100 boys:
 1856: Upper School – 30 boys; Lower School – 50-80 boys

1857: Alleyn's College of God's Gift

The College of God's Gift became Alleyn's College of God's Gift when, on 25 August 1857 the Act for confirming a Scheme of the Charity Commissioners for the College of God's Gift in Dulwich in the County of Surrey, also known as the Dulwich College Act, dissolved the existing cooperation and the charity was reconstituted with the new name. When the charity was reconstituted in 1857 it was split into two parts with a joint Board of Governors: the educational (for the college) and the "eleemosynary" (for the charity). The Master, Warden, four fellows and 12 servants were pensioned off although Alleyn's wishes were, and continue to be respected, as sixteen pensioners (being the equivalent of 12 poor brothers and sisters plus four fellows) still live in flats in the Old College looked after by a Warden. As for the Master, he was to still be appointed as the head of the new school.

The Master of the College in this new form was Reverend Alfred Carver (Master from April 1857 to April 1883), he was also the first Master not to share the name of the school's founder "Alleyn" (or latterly "Allen"). The number of pupils at the school expanded sharply during Carver's tenure:
 1858: Upper School – 66 boys; Lower School – 33 boys
 1859: Upper School – 120 boys; Lower School – 81 boys
 1870: Upper School (at the "New College") 269 boys; Lower School (at the "Old College") 242 boys
 1883: Upper School (at the "New College") 535 boys; Lower School (at the "Old College") unknown

The educational college was split into an Upper and Lower school. The Upper school was for boys between 8 and 18 to be taught a wide and detailed syllabus and continued to be colloquially referred to as Dulwich College. The Lower school being for boys between 8 and 16, with lower fees and a syllabus aimed at children of the industrial and poorer classes. The Lower School was the incorporation of the boys from the grammar school established in the previous decade and was referred to as Alleyn's College of God's Gift, although this was the name of the complete charitable foundation.
During the 1860s, when the Old College was under repair and the New College had yet to be built, both the Upper and Lower schools were housed in the building of Dulwich College Grammar School.  In the summer of 1869 the upper school took possession of the current site, referred to as the New College, but it was not until Founder's Day (21 June) 1870 that the new college was officially opened by the Prince and Princess of Wales. The new college buildings, sited in the 60 acres of Dulwich Common, were designed in a hybrid of Palladian and Gothic styles in red brick and terracotta, by Charles Barry, Jr. (the eldest son of Sir Charles Barry). The lower school alone continued to occupy the Old College in Dulwich Village from 1870 until it was moved to its new (and current) premises in 1887.

1882: Dulwich College separated from Alleyn's School
In 1882, following a scheme issued by the Charity Commissioners, an Act of Parliament was passed after which the Upper and Lower schools were officially split into separate institutions. This followed a period of political debate, resolved at appeal in 1876 at the Privy Council where Lord Selborne ruled in Alfred Carver's favour. This passed into law by Act of Parliament as an amendment to the Endowed Schools Act 1869 known as the Scheme for the Management of the Foundations Respectively Known as Alleyn's College of God's Gift at Dulwich, and the Dulwich College Picture Gallery.

The Upper School became Dulwich College (officially for the first time) and the Lower became Alleyn's School. Both schools remained within the Alleyn's College of God's Gift charitable foundation (along with James Allen's Girls' School, St Olave's and St Saviour's Grammar School, and the three Central Foundation schools in Finsbury and Bishopsgate). Both Dulwich College and Alleyn's School were managed by the College Governors who also administered the Chapel and Picture Gallery. But by this Act the Estates and Almshouses were placed in the hands of the Estates Governors. Dulwich College's income is derived from the contributions made to it by the Estates Governors, among whom the College Governors are well represented (having eight of the twenty five places)

1995 reconstitution
Alleyn's College, the reconstituted form of the charitable foundation set up in 1619, continued to own and manages the ancient Manor of Dulwich in south London and also to manage the foundation schools of Dulwich College, Alleyn's School and James Allen's Girls' School. Although inextricably associated with these schools, it was a distinct entity.

In 1995, a major reorganisation by the trustees and the Charity Commission resulted in the varied component parts of Alleyn's College being separately constituted as independent registered charities.

Leadership
Until the 1857 Act, the leader of the college were known as "Masters". The 1857 Act created a Board of Governors, and the 1882 Scheme split these in two:

Masters of the College of God's Gift
Thomas Alleyn (appointed 1619 (assumed office on death of Founder Edward Alleyn); died 1631)
Matthias Alleyn (succeeded 1631; died 1642)
Thomas Alleyn (succeeded 1642; died 1668–9)
Raph Alleyn (succeeded 1668–9; died 1677–8)
John Alleyn (succeeded 1677–8; died 1686)
Richard Alleyn (succeeded 1686; died 1690)
John Alleyn (succeeded 1690; died 1712)
Thomas Alleyn (succeeded 1712; died 1721)
James Allen (formerly Alleyn) (succeeded 1721; died 1746)
Joseph Allen (succeeded 1746; resigned 1775)
Thomas Allen (succeeded 1775; died 1805)
William Allen (succeeded 1805; died 1811)
Lancelot Baugh Allen (succeeded 1811; resigned 1820)
John Allen (succeeded 1820; died 1843)
George John Allen (succeeded 1843; pensioned 1857)

Chairmen of the Governors
Edward Smith-Stanley, 13th Earl of Derby (1857-1859)
Arthur Wellesley, 2nd Duke of Wellington (1859-1862)
The Revd William Rogers (1862-1882)

Chairmen of the Estate Governors

 Revd. W. Rogers (until Dec. 1882 )
Richard Strong (1883-1890)
William Young (1891-1892)
Francis Peek (1893-1895)
Matthew Wallace (1896-1899)
Thomas John Edwards (1900-1902)
Marmaduke John Teesdale (1903-1904)
Robert Coats Cane (1905-1907)
Edwin Thomas Hall (1908-1910)
Joseph Russell Tompkins (1911-1914)
George Crispe Whiteley (1914-1916)
J. Ratchffe Cousins (1917-1919)
William Howes, J.P. 1920–1922)

Chairmen of the College Governors (for all foundation schools)

Revd. William Rogers (1882-1896)
Horace Davey, Baron Davey (1896-1907)
Alfred Comyn Lyall (1907-1911)
Herbert Eaton, 3rd Baron Cheylesmore
John Wolfenden, Baron Wolfenden

Dulwich Picture Gallery

The College of God's Gift was bequeathed a large collection of paintings by Francis Bourgeois in 1811, which had originally been intended to form the nucleus of the collection of the last king of Poland, Stanisław August Poniatowski. Following the partitions of Poland the paintings were left to the college, which set up the Dulwich Picture Gallery under a trusteeship in a building designed by Sir John Soane, which became Britain's first public art gallery. Since 1995 the Gallery has been an independent registered charity.

Gallery of the Old College

See also
Dulwich Wood

References

External links
The Dulwich Estate website

 George Frederic Warner, Francis B . Bickley, 1881, Catalogue of the Manuscripts and Muniments of Alleyn's College of God's Gift at Dulwich

 
Educational charities based in the United Kingdom
1619 establishments in England
Education in the London Borough of Southwark
Dulwich